Béla Lengyel (born 29 October 1990) is a Hungarian attacking midfielder who plays for Budaörs.

Career statistics
.
Source

References

External links
 

1990 births
Living people
People from Szolnok
Hungarian footballers
Association football midfielders
Szolnoki MÁV FC footballers
Ceglédi VSE footballers
Budaörsi SC footballers
FC Ajka players
Nemzeti Bajnokság I players
Nemzeti Bajnokság II players
Sportspeople from Jász-Nagykun-Szolnok County